"Resucitar" (English: "Resurrect") is a song by Peruvian singer-songwriter Gian Marco. It was released by Sony Music Latin and Crescent Moon Records in mid-2004 as the lead single from his seventh studio album of the same name.

Release
After he released the theme song for the 2004 Copa América, Gian Marco released his seventh album with this song as the lead single. Gian Marco wrote the song for his wife of 10 years, Claudia Moro.

Promotion
The song was released on radio stations throughout Latin America and the U.S. in 2004. Gian Marco then embarked on his Resucitar Tour 2004 in order to promote the song along with the follow up single Lejos De Ti. Gian Marco has since then performed the song on every single one of his tours even performing the song in Asian countries like Japan.

Reception
The song peaked at #25 on the Billboard Latin Pop Songs chart, becoming his highest performing song on that chart to date. This success earned Gian Marco his first Latin Grammy Award in 2005. The song also peaked at number nine Colombia. The song stayed at that peak there for 3 weeks. The sone became a good first single for the album following up his hits Se Me Olvidó and Lamento from his previous album A Tiempo.

Music video
The music video starts with Gian Marco in an old warehouse singing the song while playing the piano. Then he is seen in a different part of the warehouse playing the guitar while surrounded by lights.

Charts

References

2004 songs
2004 singles
Gian Marco songs
Spanish-language songs
Latin pop songs
Pop ballads
Songs written by Gian Marco
Song recordings produced by Emilio Estefan